Emiliano Caffera (born 30 October 1978) is a former Uruguayan rugby union player and a current coach. He played as a scrum-half.

He played at Champagnat, in Uruguay.

He had 35 caps for Uruguay, from 2000 to 2010, scoring 12 conversions, 15 penalties and 1 drop goal, 72 points on aggregate. He was called for the 2003 Rugby World Cup, playing in two games but without scoring.

After finishing his player career, he became a coach. He was the coach of Champagnat. He was also backs coach at Uruguay squad during the 2015 Rugby World Cup.

References

External links
Emiliano Caffera International Statistics

1978 births
Living people
Uruguayan rugby union players
Uruguayan rugby union coaches
Rugby union scrum-halves
Uruguay international rugby union players